Peter Henry Barlerin is an American diplomat and career member of the Senior Foreign Service who served as the United States Ambassador to Cameroon from 2017 to 2020. He has served as an American diplomat since 1989. Prior to becoming an ambassador, he was the Deputy Assistant Secretary in the Bureau of African Affairs at the United States Department of State. Barlerin has served at seven U.S. missions overseas, including posts in Madagascar, Japan, France, Chad, and Mali.

Personal life
Barlerin speaks French, Japanese, Spanish, and Norwegian.

References

Living people
Middlebury College alumni
University of Maryland, College Park alumni
Trump administration personnel
Ambassadors of the United States to Cameroon
Year of birth missing (living people)
United States Foreign Service personnel
21st-century American diplomats